Kafoury is a surname. It may refer to:

Deborah Kafoury (born 1967), American politician in state of Oregon
Gretchen Kafoury (1942–2015), American politician, member of the Oregon House of Representatives
Stephen Kafoury (born 1941), American politician in state of Oregon

See also
Kfoury

Kafoury, and more accurately Kfoury, is a transliteration of the name from the original Arabic. It refers to a person whose origin is the village of Kfour, now non-existing, which was in the north or Lebanon.